The Municipality of Baie-James was a municipality in northern Quebec, Canada, which existed from 1971 to 2012. Located to the east of James Bay, Baie-James covered  of land, making it the largest incorporated municipality in Canada — only eight unorganized territories were larger. Its territory almost entirely (about 98%) covered the administrative region of Jamésie, although it contained less than five percent of the population. Essentially, it was the remainder of the Jamésie Territory's land after all of the major population centres were removed.

On July 24, 2012, the Quebec government signed an accord with the Cree that would result in the abolition of Baie-James and the creation of a regional government known as Eeyou Istchee James Bay Territory.

The hydroelectric power plants of the La Grande Complex were all located within the municipal boundaries of Baie-James, making the municipality strategically important to Quebec's energy policy. Other important economic sectors are mining, softwood logging, forestry, and tourism.

History
The municipality was created in 1971 and was run by the board of directors of the Société de développement de la Baie James. It managed the territory of the James Bay and Northern Quebec Agreement between the 49th and 55th parallel, with the exception of the Cree Category 1 lands and the enclaves of Chapais, Chibougamau, Lebel-sur-Quévillon and Matagami.

In December 2001, the municipal council was reformed. It became a municipality of a special type directed by the mayors of the four enclave towns, as well as the chairpersons of the local community councils of Radisson, Valcanton and Villebois. An eighth seat is reserved for a representative coming from the non-urban territory. The municipality gained additional authority and can exert certain powers as a regional county.

Under the terms of the Agreement on Governance in the Eeyou Istchee James Bay Territory of July 24, 2012, the municipality ceased to exist and was replaced by a new regional government called Eeyou Istchee James Bay Territory.

Communities in Baie-James
Beaucanton
Desmaraisville
Joutel
Miquelon
Radisson - northernmost non-native town in Quebec.
Val-Paradis
Valcanton
Villebois

Demographics

Transportation

The primary roads to and within Baie-James are:
Route 109 - provincial highway to Matagami
Route 113 - provincial highway from Val-d'Or to Chibougamau
Route 393 - regional highway to Val-Paradis
James Bay Road - road from Matagami to Radisson
North Road
Trans-Taiga Road - access road to hydro-electric stations of the James Bay Project

Air transportation is through the La Grande Rivière Airport near Radisson, which provides scheduled air service to Montreal and Puvirnituq.

Geography
Nearby lakes include Lake Naococane.

References

External links
 Website of the Eeyou Istchee James Bay Regional Government 
 Grand Council of the Crees
 Cree Tourism

Municipality of Baie-James
Human Environment of the James Bay region (Detailed map of the James Bay region)
Map of Baie-James

Former municipalities in Quebec
James Bay
Populated places established in 1971
Populated places disestablished in 2012
1971 establishments in Quebec
2012 disestablishments in Quebec

de:Baie-James